A parabolic partial differential equation is a type of partial differential equation (PDE). Parabolic PDEs are used to describe a wide variety of time-dependent phenomena, including heat conduction, particle diffusion, and pricing of derivative investment instruments.

Definition 
A second-order, linear, constant-coefficient PDE for  takes the form

and this PDE is classified as being parabolic if the coefficients satisfy the condition

Usually  represents one-dimensional position and  represents time,
and the PDE is solved subject to prescribed initial and boundary conditions.

The name "parabolic" is used because the assumption on the coefficients is the same as the condition
for the analytic geometry equation 
to define a planar parabola.

The basic example of a parabolic PDE is the one-dimensional heat equation,

The heat equation says, roughly, that temperature at a given time and point rises or falls at a rate proportional to the difference between the temperature at that point and the average temperature near that point. The quantity  measures how far off the temperature is from satisfying the mean value property of harmonic functions.

The concept of a parabolic PDE can be generalized in several ways.
For instance, the flow of heat through a material body is governed by the three-dimensional heat equation,

where

This equation is the prototype of a multi-dimensional parabolic PDE.

Noting that  is an elliptic operator suggests a broader definition of a parabolic PDE:

where  is a second-order elliptic operator
(implying that  must be positive;
a case where  is considered below).

A system of partial differential equations for a vector  can also be parabolic.
For example, such a system is hidden in an equation of the form

if the matrix-valued function  has a kernel of dimension 1.

Parabolic PDEs can also be nonlinear.  For example, Fisher's equation is a nonlinear PDE that includes the same diffusion term as the heat equation but incorporates a linear growth term and a nonlinear decay term.

Solution 
Under broad assumptions, an initial/boundary-value problem for a linear parabolic PDE has a solution for all time.

For a nonlinear parabolic PDE, a solution of an initial/boundary-value problem might explode in a singularity within a finite amount of time. It can be difficult to determine whether a solution exists for all time, or to understand the singularities that do arise. Such interesting questions arise in the solution of the Poincaré conjecture via Ricci flow.

Backward parabolic equation 
One occasionally encounters a so-called backward parabolic PDE, which takes the form  (note the absence of a minus sign).

An initial-value problem for the backward heat equation,

is equivalent to a final-value problem for the ordinary heat equation,

Similarly to a final-value problem for a parabolic PDE, an initial-value problem for a backward parabolic PDE is usually not well-posed (solutions often grow unbounded in finite time, or even fail to exist). Nonetheless, these problems are important for the study of the reflection of singularities of solutions to various other PDEs.

Examples 
 Black-Scholes equation
 Heat equation
 Mean curvature flow
 Ricci flow

See also  
Hyperbolic partial differential equation
Elliptic partial differential equation
Autowave

References

Further reading